Tour de Ruhr  is a 1981 West German television miniseries with six episodes.

See also
List of German television series

External links
 

1981 German television series debuts
1981 German television series endings
Television shows set in North Rhine-Westphalia
German-language television shows
Das Erste original programming